Colour Sergeant Joshua Mark Leakey  (born 1988) is a British soldier currently serving in the Parachute Regiment. In 2015, Leakey was awarded the Victoria Cross, the highest military decoration for valour in the British and Commonwealth armed forces, for his involvement in a joint UK–US raid in Helmand Province, Afghanistan, on 22 August 2013. He was the only living British soldier to be awarded the Victoria Cross for the War in Afghanistan.

Early life and family
Leakey was born in 1988. He is the son of retired RAF officer and former director of the Armed Forces Christian Union, Air Commodore Mark Leakey, and his wife Rosemary, an occupational therapist.  He has a younger brother Ben.

Leakey was educated at Witham Hall preparatory school and, from 1999 to 2006, Christ's Hospital, a private school in Horsham, West Sussex. He began a degree in military history at the University of Kent but dropped out during the first term to join the military.

He is the second member of his family to be awarded the Victoria Cross. His second cousin twice removed, Nigel Leakey, was posthumously awarded the medal during the Second World War. Lieutenant General David Leakey, the former Black Rod and former senior British Army officer, is the son of Nigel's brother Major General Rea Leakey.

Military career
Leakey joined the British Army in 2007 and was subsequently posted to the 1st Battalion, Parachute Regiment. He served three tours of duty in Afghanistan during Operation Herrick: in 2009, 2011 and 2013.

Victoria Cross action
The actions for which Leakey was awarded the Victoria Cross occurred on 22 August 2013 in Helmand Province, Afghanistan. A routine joint patrol composed of British paratroopers, US Marines and Afghan soldiers had targeted a village to search for illegal weapons. Having been flown into the area in Chinook helicopters, the patrol was attacked by machine gun fire and rocket-propelled grenades soon after dismounting. Leakey's helicopter had landed on a hill near the village and he, with three other paratroopers and an Afghan soldier, were to provide fire support for the main segment of the patrol. From their vantage point, his section could see the attack and heard over their radio that someone had been injured. Leakey ran up the hill to assess the seriousness of the attack and came to the conclusion that urgent action was needed. Though he was only a lance corporal, he took control of the situation and led his section down to the group under attack.

Having reached the group under attack, he gave first aid to the wounded US Marine Corps captain and began to evacuate him from the battlefield. While under fire, he returned to the machine guns that his section had left at the top of the hill. He moved one to a better position to fire at the attacking Taliban even though he was under constant, accurate fire (bullets were ricocheting off the weapon he was carrying). His actions inspired other soldiers to join in the fight back.

While he was manning the machine gun, he was also shouting updates of the situation into his radio. Having realised that more than one machine gun would be needed to effectively fight back the insurgents, he allowed his gun to be taken over by another soldier. He then ran once more through heavy fire to retrieve a second machine gun, position it in a suitable site, and then manned it to fire at the Taliban.

The skirmish lasted approximately 45 minutes during which 11 insurgents were killed and four wounded. It was only when air support arrived that fighting ceased. When it did, he handed the second machine gun over to another soldier. He then returned to the injured American officer and oversaw his medical evacuation.

The Ministry of Defence summarised the reasons for awarding Leakey the Victoria Cross as follows:

Honours and decorations

On 26 February 2015, Leakey was awarded the Victoria Cross (VC), the highest military decoration awarded for valour in the United Kingdom. Announcing the award, the Chief of the General Staff, General Sir Nicholas Carter broke with tradition to hug Leakey. On 14 April 2015, he received the medal from Queen Elizabeth II during a ceremony at Windsor Castle. He is a recipient of the Operational Service Medal for Afghanistan. Leakey has received the City of London's highest honour to become a Freeman of the city.

The official VC citation reads:

See also
Leakey family

References

Living people
1988 births
British Army personnel of the War in Afghanistan (2001–2021)
British Army recipients of the Victoria Cross
British Parachute Regiment soldiers
Joshua
People educated at Christ's Hospital
War in Afghanistan (2001–2021) recipients of the Victoria Cross